The 1988 Vanderbilt Commodores football team represented Vanderbilt University in the 1988 NCAA Division I-A football season as a member of the Southeastern Conference (SEC). The Commodores were led by head coach Watson Brown in his third season and finished with a record of three wins and eight losses (3–8 overall, 2–5 in the SEC).

Schedule

References

Vanderbilt
Vanderbilt Commodores football seasons
Vanderbilt Commodores football